The 2006 Craven District Council election took place on 4 May 2006 to elect members of Craven District Council in North Yorkshire, England. One third of the council was up for election and the council stayed under no overall control.

After the election, the composition of the council was as follows:
Conservative 13
Independent 11
Liberal Democrats 6

Candidates
Candidates at the election included possibly the oldest candidate in the country, Bob Leakey, at the age of 91, who stood for his own Virtue Currency Cognitive Appraisal Party in Settle and Ribblebanks, after having stood at the 2005 general election in Skipton and Ripon constituency. Another candidate at the election was the leader of the Craven Ratepayers Action Group, Alan Perrow, who was nominated for the Conservatives, against independent councillor Philip Barrett. However Perrow quit the party days after being approached to be a Conservative candidate, to instead stand independently at the election, although he was still on the ballot paper as a Conservative.

Election result
There was no change in the composition of the council, after all of the sitting councillors held the seats they were defending. This left the Conservatives with 13 seats, independents had 11 seats and there were 6 Liberal Democrats.

Ward results

References

2006
2006 English local elections
2000s in North Yorkshire